The Kraków School of Mathematics was a subgroup of the Polish School of Mathematics represented by mathematicians from the Kraków universities—Jagiellonian University, and the AGH University of Science and Technology–active during the interwar period (1918–1939). Their areas of study were primarily classical analysis, differential equations, and analytic functions.

The Kraków School of Differential Equations was founded by Tadeusz Ważewski, a student of Stanisław Zaremba, and was internationally appreciated after World War II. 

The Kraków School of Analytic Functions was founded by Franciszek Leja. Other notable members included Kazimierz Żorawski, Władysław Ślebodziński, Stanisław Gołąb, and Czesław Olech.

See also
Polish School of Mathematics
Lwów School of Mathematics
Warsaw School of Mathematics
Polish Mathematical Society
Kraków School of Mathematics and Astrology

References

 

Polish mathematics
History of mathematics
History of education in Poland
20th century in Kraków
Jagiellonian University